The Madonna and Child with Saints Polyptych is a five piece Madonna polyptych by Italian Renaissance artist Duccio di Buoninsegna, also referred to as Polyptych no. 47 by Duccio.

The bright colors and gold used in the work reflect Duccio's usual style. Above the Madonna, Child and four saints, the polyptych depicts ten patriarchs and prophets. Christ is at the apex of the polyptych and is flanked by four angels below him.
The saints depicted are Agnes, John the Evangelist, John the Baptist, and Mary Magdalene.

It was painted between 1311 and 1318, (tempera and gold on wood) and is located at the Pinacoteca Nazionale in Siena, Italy.

See also
 Roman Catholic Marian art

Paintings by Duccio
Polyptychs
Paintings of the Madonna and Child
Paintings depicting John the Baptist
Paintings depicting Mary Magdalene
1310s paintings